is a 1993 American comedy film directed by Steve Rash, written by Fax Bahr, Adam Small, and Shawn Schepps, and starring Pauly Shore, Lane Smith, and Carla Gugino.

Plot
18-year-old Rebecca “Becca" Warner (Carla Gugino) moves from her small South Dakota farm town to attend college at the fictional University of Los Angeles. On her first day, she and her parents Walter (Lane Smith) and Connie (Cindy Pickett) meet Crawl (Pauly Shore) resident advisor of Becca's coed dormitory. After they leave, the clash of cultures causes Becca to consider returning home, but Crawl convinces her to give the college a chance. She soon begins to acclimate, cutting and dyeing her hair, dressing in a Californian style, and even getting a tattoo of a butterfly on her ankle. Becca invites Crawl to spend the Thanksgiving break with her family back home.

When Becca and Crawl arrive in South Dakota, the Warners and Becca's boyfriend Travis (Dan Gauthier) are shocked by the changes in Becca. At dinner, Becca realizes that Travis wants to propose marriage to her and she urges Crawl to speak. Unable to come up with anything off the cuff, Crawl tells them that he has already proposed and she had accepted. This upsets Becca's family, who begin to disdain Crawl, and Travis, who punches Crawl in the face.

Now acting as a future son-in-law, Crawl expresses an interest in farming but bumbles his way through daily chores, to the amusement of Walter and his farmhand Theo (Dennis Burkley). However, Crawl begins to prove himself as an avid farmer, quickly learning how to perform each task he's given. He also begins to endear himself to the rest of the family. He impresses Becca's little brother Zack (Patrick Renna) with his computer skills, and Zack begins to see him as a big brother. He compliments Connie's appearance and helps to bring her out of her shell for Walter. When Walter's father has a heart attack, Crawl performs CPR and earns Walter's trust for aiding his father.

While shopping for clothes, Crawl meets Becca's friend Tracy (Tiffani Thiessen). Travis apologizes to Crawl for hitting him and invites him to a bachelor party, where Tracy dances for Crawl.

The next morning, Becca finds Crawl and Tracy waking up in the barn and furiously calls off the wedding, but Crawl and Tracy cannot remember what happened. Crawl leaves to head back to L.A. while Travis, who had been seeing Tracy on the side, berates her for behavior the previous night. Tracy finds her car seat suspiciously left all the way back and discovers a bottle of pills underneath it.

After picking up Crawl, who was attempting to hitchhike, Tracy visits the Warner house to confront Travis and Theo while the Warners are sitting down to Thanksgiving dinner. Theo confesses that they drugged them and that he set them up in the barn. Walter immediately fires Theo despite his honesty. Becca stands up to Travis and Crawl knocks him down, revealing that he had majored in karate for two semesters.

After Travis and Theo leave, Tracy is invited to sit with the Warners while Walter asks his son-in-law to cut the turkey. Becca tries to speak the truth about Crawl's proposal, but he stops her, saying that they have not yet decided on a wedding date and need wait a while before making the decision, hinting that he intends to legitimately propose to Rebecca and have a proper relationship that the Warners will respect.

Cast
 Pauly Shore as Fred/"Crawl"
 Carla Gugino as Rebecca "Becca" Warner
 Lane Smith as Walter Warner
 Cindy Pickett as Connie Warner
 Mason Adams as Walter Warner, Sr.
 Patrick Renna as Zack Warner
 Dennis Burkley as Theo
 Dan Gauthier as Travis
 Tiffani-Amber Thiessen as Tracy
 Adam Goldberg as Indian
 Flea as tattoo artist

Brendan Fraser reprises his role of Linkovich "Link" Chomovsky from Encino Man in a cameo appearance.

Production
After Encino Man, Shore was considering a project with New Line Cinema, but was heavily pressured by Disney chairman Jeffrey Katzenberg to stay with Disney and make Son in Law.

Promotions
The promotional poster for the film is a parody of the painting American Gothic. The opening title sequence and graduation ceremony scene were filmed at Wasco High School in Wasco, California.

To promote the film, MTV ran a contest to marry Pauly Shore in Las Vegas, won by Tanya Cinotti of Salisbury, Mass. Though there was a ceremony on July 2, 1993, no marriage certificates were signed.

Reception
Rotten Tomatoes gives the film a score of 21% based on reviews from 19 critics.

In the Los Angeles Times, reviewer Michael Wilmington suggested that the film "... tries to pretend that it’s about tolerance: a kind of Guess Who’s Coming to Dinner about anti-L.A. freak bigotry". He also criticized the film's premise: 

In the United States and Canada, the film grossed $36.4 million. By the end of 1993, it had grossed $4.6 million internationally.

References

External links
 
 

1993 films
1993 romantic comedy films
American romantic comedy films
1990s English-language films
Films directed by Steve Rash
Films scored by Richard Gibbs
Films set in South Dakota
Films set in Los Angeles
Films shot in California
Hollywood Pictures films
Thanksgiving in films
1990s American films